Akal Security, Inc. is a security company which has federal contracts  to guard immigration detention centers, federal courthouses, NASA facilities, federal buildings in Washington, D.C., and numerous embassies under construction. Akal Security and a subsidiary company, Coastal International Security, have received over $1 billion in federal security contracts.

History
Akal Security, Inc. was founded in 1980 after Gurutej Singh Khalsa found that, although he had some experience in law enforcement, "his beard and turban prevented him from getting a job". The company was started with a $1,200 loan from co-founder Daya Singh Khalsa. Akal Security is one of a number of companies run by followers of the Sikh Dharma sangat.

Akal Security had a large expansion in contracts after the September 11th attacks because it was able to recruit a large number of former law enforcement and military personnel. According to The New York Times, the company has benefited from the Army's low-price approach to determining contracts because Akal Security has low overhead and good past performances.

References

External links

Companies based in New Mexico
Business services companies established in 1980
Security companies of the United States